Apotropaic magic (from Greek  "to ward off") or protective magic is a type of magic intended to turn away harm or evil influences, as in deflecting misfortune or averting the evil eye. Apotropaic observances may also be practiced out of superstition or out of tradition, as in good luck charms (perhaps some token on a charm bracelet), amulets, or gestures such as crossed fingers or knocking on wood. Many different objects and charms were used for protection throughout history.

Symbols and objects

Ancient Egyptian 
Apotropaic magical rituals were practiced throughout the ancient Near East and ancient Egypt. Fearsome deities were invoked via ritual in order to protect individuals by warding away evil spirits. In ancient Egypt, these household rituals (performed in the home, not in state-run temples) were embodied by the deity who personified magic itself, Heka. The two gods most frequently invoked in these rituals were the hippopotamus-formed fertility goddess, Taweret, and the lion-deity, Bes (who developed from the early apotropaic dwarf god, Aha, literally "fighter").

Objects were often used in these rituals in order to facilitate communication with the gods. One of the most commonly found magical objects, the ivory apotropaic wand (birth tusk), gained widespread popularity in the Middle Kingdom (ca. 1550 – 1069 BCE). These wands were used to protect expectant mothers and children from malevolent forces, and were adorned with processions of apotropaic solar deities.

Likewise, protective amulets bearing the likenesses of gods and goddesses such as Taweret were commonly worn. Water came to be used frequently in ritual as well, wherein libation vessels in the shape of Taweret were used to pour healing water over an individual. In much later periods (when Egypt came under the Greek Ptolemies), stele featuring the god Horus were used in similar rituals; water would be poured over the stele and—after ritually acquiring healing powers—was collected in a basin for an afflicted person to drink.

Ancient Greek 
The ancient Greeks had various protective symbols and objects, with various names, such as apotropaia, probaskania, periammata, periapta and profylaktika.
The Greeks made offerings to the "averting gods", chthonic deities and heroes who grant safety and deflect evil and for the protection of the infants they wore on them amulets with apotropaic powers and committed the child to the care of kourotrophic (child-nurturing) deities. Greeks placed talismans in their houses and wore amulets to protected them from the evil eye. Peisistratus hung the figure of a kind of grasshopper before the Acropolis of Athens for protection.

Another way for protection from fascination used by the ancient Greeks was by spitting into the folds of the clothes.

Ancient Greeks also had an old custom of dressing boys as girls in order to avert the evil eye.

Crosses 
In Ireland, it is customary on St Brigid's Day to weave a Brigid's cross from rushes, which is hung over doors and windows to protect the household from fire, lightning, illness and evil spirits. In southern Ireland, it was formerly the custom at Samhain to weave a cross of sticks and straw called a 'parshell' or 'parshall', which was fixed over the doorway to ward-off bad luck, illness and witchcraft.

Eyes 
Eyes were often painted to ward off the evil eye. An exaggerated apotropaic eye or a pair of eyes were painted on Greek drinking vessels called kylikes (eye-cups) from the 6th century BCE. The exaggerated eyes may have been intended to prevent evil spirits from entering the mouth while drinking. Fishing boats in some parts of the Mediterranean region still have stylised eyes painted on the bows. The defunct Turkish budget airline, Fly Air, adopted the symbol nazar boncuğu (nazar bonjuk) on the vertical stabilizer (fin) of its aeroplanes. The apotropaic Yiddish expression,  (in modern Hebrew), is somewhat equivalent to the expression, "knock on wood."

Faces 
Among the ancient Greeks, the most widely used image intended to avert evil was that of the Gorgon, the head of which now may be called the Gorgoneion, which features wild eyes, fangs, and protruding tongue. The full figure of the Gorgon holds the apex of the oldest remaining Greek temple where she is flanked by two lionesses. The Gorgon head was mounted on the aegis and shield of Athena.

People believed that the doorways and windows of buildings were particularly vulnerable to the entry or passage of evil. In ancient Greece, grotesque, satyr-like bearded faces, sometimes with the pointed cap of the workman, were carved over the doors of ovens and kilns, to protect the work from fire and mishap. Later, on churches and castles, gargoyles or other grotesque faces and figures such as sheela na gigs and hunky punks were carved to frighten away witches and other malign influences. Figures may also have been carved at fireplaces or chimneys; in some cases, simple geometric or letter carvings were used for these. When a wooden post was used to support a chimney opening, this was often an easier material for amateur carving. To discourage witchcraft, rowan wood may have been chosen for the post or mantel.

Similarly the grotesque faces carved into pumpkin lanterns (and their earlier counterparts, made from turnips, swedes or beets) at Halloween are meant to avert evil: this season was Samhain, the Celtic new year. As a "time between times", it was believed to be a period when souls of the dead and other dangerous spirits walked the earth. Many European peoples had such associations with the period following the harvest in the fall (for instance the Celtic calendar).

Phalluses 
In Ancient Greece, phalloi were believed to have apotropaic qualities. Often stone reliefs would be placed above doorways, and three-dimensional versions were erected across the Greek world. Most notable of these were the urban monuments found on the island of Delos. The phallus was also an apotropaic symbol for the ancient Romans. These are known as fascinum.

A similar use of phallic representations to ward off the evil eye remains popular in modern Bhutan. It is associated with the 500-year-old Buddhist tradition of Drukpa Kunley. It is paralleled by other South Asian uses of the lingam symbol.

Reflective items 
Mirrors and other shiny reflective objects were believed to deflect the evil eye. Traditional English "Plough Jags" (performers of a regional variant of the mummers play) sometimes decorated their costumes (particularly their hats) with shiny items, to the extent of borrowing silver plate for the purpose. "Witch balls" are shiny blown glass ornaments, such as Christmas baubles, that were hung in windows. Similarly, the Chinese Bagua mirror is usually installed to ward off negative energy and protect the entryways of residences.

An example of the use of shiny apotropaic objects in Judaism can be found in the so-called “Halsgezeige” or textile neckbands used in the birthing customs of the Franco-German border region. Shiny coins or colourful stones would be sewn onto the neckband or on a central amulet in order to distract the evil eye. These neckbands were worn by women in childbirth and by young boys during their Brit Milah ceremony. This custom continued until the early 20th century.

Horseshoes
In Western culture, a horseshoe was often nailed up over, or close by, doorways (see Oakham's horseshoes). Model horseshoes (of card or plastic) are given as good-luck tokens, particularly at weddings, and small paper horseshoes feature in confetti.

Objects buried in walls
In early modern Europe, certain objects were buried in the walls of houses to protect the household from witchcraft. These included specially-prepared witch bottles, horse skulls and the bodies of dried cats, as well as shoes (see concealed shoes).

Markings on buildings
Apotropaic marks, also called 'witch marks' or 'anti-witch marks' in Europe, are symbols or patterns scratched on the walls, beams and thresholds of buildings to protect them from witchcraft or evil spirits. They have many forms; in Britain they are often flower-like patterns of overlapping circles. Taper burn marks on thresholds of early modern buildings are also thought to be apotropaic marks.

Dreamcatchers
In some Native American cultures, a dreamcatcher made of yarn like a web is placed above a bed or sleeping area to protect sleeping children from nightmares.

Others
Items and symbols such as crosses, crucifixes, silver bullets, wild roses and garlic were believed to ward off or destroy vampires.

In Ireland and Great Britain, magpies are traditionally thought to bring bad luck. Many people repeated various rhymes or salutations to placate them.

Peisistratus hung the figure of a kind of grasshopper before the Acropolis of Athens as apotropaic magic.

In Roman art, envy was thought to bring bad luck to the person envied. To avoid envy, Romans sought to incite laughter in their guests by using humorous images. Images such as large phalluses (see fascinus), deformities such as hunchbacks, or Pygmies and other non-Roman subjects were common. Romans saw deformity as comical and believed that such images could be used to deflect the evil eye.

In Europe, apotropaic figureheads carved onto the prow of sailing ships are considered to have been a replacement for the sacrifice of a thrall during the Age of Invasions by Saxon and Viking sailors, to avoid bad luck on the voyage.  Dredging the Thames under London Bridge led to the discovery of a large number of bent and broken knives, daggers, swords and coins, from the modern period and dating back to Celtic times.  This custom seems to have been to avoid bad luck, particularly when setting off on a voyage.  Similarly, the burial of an old boot or shoe by the lintel of the back door of a house seems to have had a similar intention.

Apotropaic marks such as the initials of the Virgin Mary were scratched near the openings of buildings in England to ward off witches.

Rituals and actions

Charms

Hand gestures

Spitting on clothes
Ancient Greeks and Romans used to spit into the folds of clothes as a way of protection from fascination.

Dressing boys as girls
Ancient Greeks also had an old custom of dressing boys as girls in order to avert the evil eye.

Fire rituals

Fire was used in rituals of protection in many parts of Europe up to the early modern era. The need-fire or force-fire was a special fire kindled to ward-off plague and murrain (infectious diseases affecting livestock) in parts of western, northern and eastern Europe. It could only be kindled by friction between wood, by a group of certain people, after all other fires in the area were doused. The livestock would be driven around the need-fire or over its embers, and all other fires would be re-lit from it. Two early medieval Irish texts say that druids used to drive cattle between two bonfires "with great incantations", to protect them from disease. Almost 1,000 years later, in the 19th century, the custom of driving cattle between two fires was still practiced across most of Ireland and parts of Scotland.

Also in Ireland and Scotland, bonfires were lit for the festivals Beltane and Samhain, and 18th–19th century accounts suggest the fires, smoke and ashes were deemed to have protective powers. In some areas, torches of burning fir or turf from the bonfire were carried sunwise around homes and fields to protect them. In central and northern Europe, bonfires lit on Walpurgis Night and at Midsummer were also believed to ward-off evil.

Magic circle

Apotropaic names  
Ashkenazi Jews' apotropaic names were often given not at birth but during serious illness. In the case of a family who had already lost a child, the parents may name the next child Alter and Alte (both meaning "old" in Yiddish) in an effort to confuse the Angel of Death.  Another example is Nekras (Некрас, "not handsome" in Russian) which was given with the hope the child would be handsome. 

Among Serbian names are many apotropaic names (zaštitna imena, "protective names"), such as Vuk ("wolf") (and its many derivatives) and Staniša ("stone").

Historical Chinese given names sometimes had apotropaic meanings, such as in the case of Huo Qubing (霍 去病, "Qubing" meaning "away with illness"), or Xin Qiji (辛 棄疾, "Qiji" meaning "abandoning disease"). Some traditional Taiwanese names referenced domestic animals such as "buffalo" (水牛) and "dog" (狗, 犬), or humble elements of the landscape such as "soil" and "water" (土, 水). They conveyed contentment with a peaceful and low-profile life.

See also 

 Sympathetic magic
 Amulet
 Anasyrma
 Azusa Yumi
 Exorcism
 Eyespot (mimicry)
 Gargoyle
 Gorgoneion
 Hama Yumi
 Hamsa
 Hoko (doll)
 Jack-o'-lantern
 Mezuzah
 
 Ofuda
 Painted pebbles
 Pazuzu
 Peijainen
 Sheela na gig
 Singa (mythology)
 Skandola
 Talisman
 Witch bottle

Explanatory notes

References

Further reading 
 Frazer, Sir James, The Golden Bough,
 Graves, Robert, The White Goddess,
 Jane Ellen Harrison, Prolegomena to the Study of Greek Religion
 Roud, Steve (2004). A Pocket Guide to Superstitions of the British Isles. London: Penguin. .

External links 

 The Golden Bough: on-line text, 1922 abridged edition
 Sue Dewsbury, "Folk Plays – January 2004 – Coleby Plough Jag", photos of Mummers, Traditional Drama Research Group
 Apotropaic protection at Kilbirnie Place castle keep, North Ayrshire, Scotland.

Anthropology of religion
Magic (supernatural)
Folklore
Religious objects
Objects believed to protect from evil
Amulets
Talismans
Muism